The 2018 Taiwanese municipal elections for both mayoral and magisterial candidates were held on 24 November 2018, as part of the larger local elections in Taiwan.

2018 municipal election candidate nominations

Results summary
Bold represents incumbent re-elected.

Special municipality

Taipei 
Political context prior to the elections

As the capital of Taiwan, Taipei functions as the economic and political center of Taiwan, and is currently its largest city. Taipei's mayoral race has been hotly contested between Kuomintang and the Democratic Progressive Party since the 1994 local election. This seat has notably been held by former presidents Lee Teng Hui, Chen Shui Bian, and Ma Ying-jeou. The position has been widely speculated to be a "first-step" towards the presidential office.

In 2014 DPP-supported independent candidate Doctor Ko Wen-je received a 57% majority of the votes over Kuomintang's Sean Lien, ending the 16-year Kuomintang administration of Taipei.

Results of the primary

Opinion polls

Predictions

Results
According to Civil Servants Election And Recall Act article 69, because Independent Ko Wen-je and Kuomintang's Ting Shou-chung vote percentages are within 0.30 margin, Kuomintang's Ting Shou-chung was entitled to, and did, call for a recount.

New Taipei 
Political context prior to the elections

New Taipei City is located in the northernmost region of Taiwan and is the ROC's most populous city. New Taipei was upgraded to Special Municipality status in 2010. Due to the vast territory, the number of voters has surpassed 3 million, becoming a Pan blue coalition and Pan green coalition camps battleground.

Before upgrading to special municipality status, the then Taipei County was controlled by the Kuomintang until the 1989 local election, with the then newly formed Democratic Progressive Party winning the seat for four straight terms in 16 years until Kuomintang's Chou Hsi-wei won power in 2005.

After the upgrade to special municipality status in 2010, Kuomintang's Eric Chu won the seat for two consecutive terms, including the 2014 local election.

Results of the primary

Opinion polls

Predictions

Results

Taoyuan 
Political context prior to the elections

In late 2014, Taoyuan City was upgraded to special municipality status from Taoyuan County. Taoyuan is known for its diversity, mostly migrants from South East Asia region. 
Before the 1990s, Taoyuan County has been long held by Kuomintang except 1977-1979, 1997-2001 and 2014 until present.

In the 1997 by-election, the Democratic Progressive Party nominated Annette Lu, winning the seat over the Kuomintang and subsequently won it until the 2001 local election.

In 2001 local election, Kuomintang won the seat back from the DPP for three straight terms in 13 years until 2014 local election, losing to the Democratic Progressive Party-nominated candidate Cheng Wen-tsan by 30,000 votes.

Results of the primary

Opinion polls

Results

Taichung 
Political context prior to the elections

Taichung City is the second largest metropolis in Taiwan, serves as the economic, cultural and transportation hub in the central part of Taiwan. It was merged and reorganized at the end of 2010 by Taichung County and Taichung City forming Taichung City. The former Taichung County was controlled by the Kuomintang except in 1997, the Democratic Progressive Party's Liao Yung-lai was elected as the county mayor.

Taichung City before in the 1980s are held by Independent or Kuomintang's Zhang and Lai factions. In the 1980s, the Kuomintang changed its nomination strategy to regain its power, by choosing non-faction candidates defeated Tzeng Wen-po (曾文坡), who is seeking for re-election in 1981, starting a four straight terms in 16 years. In 1997, the Democratic Progressive Party's Chang Wen-ying was elected for Taichung City mayor due to the Pan blue coalition split.

In 2001, Kuomintang's Jason Hu was elected as Taichung City mayor until 2010's merger and won the third term as the first mayor of the newly formed Taichung City with 36,351 votes.
In 2014, Democratic Progressive Party's candidate Lin Chia-lung won 57% of the votes, elected as the Taichung City mayor due to unhappiness towards the Kuomintang government.

Results of the primary

Opinion polls

Predictions

Results

Tainan 
Political context prior to the elections

Tainan City is located in Taiwan's Chia-Nan Plain, is a cultural capital for its history. Tainan City was merged and reorganized at the end of 2010, merging with Tainan County of Taiwan Province.

The original Tainan County in the 1990s, Kuomintang local faction took turns taking control. However, Tainan County turned blue to green until Democratic Progressive Party's candidate Mark Chen became the mayor in 1993 until the merger between the county and the city was since led by the Democratic Progressive Party.

The original Tainan City was dominated by Independents and the Kuomintang government for many years before the 1990s. Since 1997, the Democratic Progressive Party candidate Helen Chang was elected mayor, the former Tainan City since had been governed by the Democratic Progressive Party at the county level. After the merger of counties and cities in 2010, the DPP's William Lai was also elected as mayor.

Results of the primary

Opinion polls

Results

Kaohsiung 
Political context prior to the elections

Kaohsiung is the third largest city in Taiwan and capital of the political and economic center of the southern region. The special municipality city is merged in 2010 with Kaohsiung County from Taiwan Province. 
The former Kaohsiung County before the 1980s is led by the Kuomintang, and the independents until 1985 where Democratic Progressive Party has led the county until the merger of the county and city.

Since the implementation of local autonomy in 1950, the former Kaohsiung City has been led by the KMT except the 6th mayor Yang Jinhu, who was a non-KMT candidate. After Kaohsiung was elevated into a municipality in 1979, the mayor was appointed by the Central Government and opened up first election in 1994 where Kuomintang's Wu Den-yih was first elected mayor of the city. In 1998, the Democratic Progressive Party's Frank Hsieh won the mayoral election by a slim margin over the incumbent mayor Wu Den-yih, starting the DPP's straight 4 terms, 16 years rule until the merger.

Results of the primary

Opinion polls

Predictions

Results

Taiwan Province

Keelung 
Political context prior to the elections

Results of the primary

Opinion polls

Results

Yilan County 
Political context prior to the elections

Results of the primary

Opinion polls

Results

Hsinchu County 
Political context prior to the elections

Results of the primary

Opinion polls

Results

Hsinchu 
Political context prior to the elections

Results of the primary

Opinion polls

Results

Miaoli County 
Political context prior to the elections

Results of the primary

Opinion polls

Results

Changhua County 
Political context prior to the elections

Results of the primary

Opinion polls

Results

Nantou County 
Political context prior to the elections

Results of the primary

Opinion polls

Results

Yunlin County 
Political context prior to the elections

Results of the primary

Opinion polls

Results

Chiayi County 
Political context prior to the elections

Results of the primary

Opinion polls

Results

Chiayi City 
Political context prior to the elections

Results of the primary

Opinion polls

Predictions

Results

Pingtung County 
Political context prior to the elections

Results of the primary

Opinion polls

Results

Hualien County 
Political context prior to the elections

Results of the primary

Opinion polls

Results

Taitung County 
Political context prior to the elections

Results of the primary

Opinion polls

Results

Penghu County 
Political context prior to the elections

Result of the primary

Opinion polls

Results

Fujian Province

Kinmen County
Political context prior to the elections

Results of the primary

Opinion polls

Results

Lienchiang County 
Political context prior to the elections

Results of the primary

Opinion polls

Results

See also
 2018 Taiwanese local elections
 2019 Taiwanese by-elections
 2020 Taiwan legislative election
 2020 Taiwan presidential election

References

External links 
Republic of China Central Election Commission

Municipal
2018